Molly Bawn may refer to:

 Molly Bawn (novel), an 1878 novel by Margaret Wolfe Hungerford
 Molly Bawn (film), a 1916 film directed by Cecil M. Hepworth
 Polly Vaughn, as a variant version of the Irish folk-song